Meet the Parents is the soundtrack that accompanies the 2000 film Meet the Parents. The soundtrack album was released on September 26, 2000 on the DreamWorks Records label. "A Fool in Love", an original composition by Randy Newman featured on the album, was nominated for an Academy Award for Best Original Song at the 73rd Academy Awards which marked the 14th time that Newman's music was nominated for an Oscar. The same song also won the 16th Annual ASCAP Film & Television Music Award and was nominated at the Golden Satellite Awards 2000.

Track listing 
 Randy Newman – "A Fool in Love" (2:16)
 Randy Newman – "Poor Me" (1:34)
 Randy Newman – "Got My Mojo Working" (1:58)
 Randy Newman – "Give Me a Sign" (3:18)
 Randy Newman – "Meet the Parents" (2:40)
 Randy Newman – "Could You Milk Me?" (2:39)
 Randy Newman – "Greg Loses Jinx" (1:48)
 Randy Newman – "Burning Down the House" (1:56)
 Randy Newman – "Wrong Cat" (1:05)
 Randy Newman – "The Car Race" (2:48)
 Randy Newman – "Broken Hearted" (1:16)
 Randy Newman – "Pam's Problem" (1:50)
 Randy Newman – "Jack to the Rescue" (1:05)
 Randy Newman – "Together Again" (1:21)
 Bobby Womack – "I'm Your Puppet" (3:32)
 Lee Dorsey – "Ya Ya" (2:27)
 Dr. John – "Big Chief" (3:25)
 Randy Newman – "A Fool in Love" featuring Susanna Hoffs (2:27)

Release history

References

External links 
 Meet the Parents soundtrack at the soundtrackINFO project
 [ Meet the Parents soundtrack] at Billboard
 Meet The Parents soundtrack at RandyNewman.info

Comedy film soundtracks
2000 soundtrack albums
DreamWorks Records soundtracks
Pop soundtracks
Randy Newman soundtracks